Dennis Brian Yagmich (born 23 August 1948) is a former Australian cricketer.

Yagmich played in 24 first-class matches in a career spanning 1972/73 and 1976/77.  As a right hand batsman and wicket-keeper he also played in six World Series Cricket Country Cup matches (a series of non-capital city matches played between the WSC SuperTests series) for Australia in 1977/78.

For his local club Midland-Guildford Cricket Club, he holds the record for the most career dismissals: 332 (272 catches, 60 stumpings) and the most dismissals in a season: 46 in 1968–69 (39c, 7st).

Yagmich currently works as an accountant in the Midland area and is an officeholder at the Western Australian Croatian Chamber of Commerce.

References

External links

1948 births
Living people
Western Australia cricketers
South Australia cricketers
World Series Cricket players
Australian cricketers
Wicket-keepers